Serhiy (or Sergei) Yuriyovych Morozov (30 April 1950 – 22 October 2021) was a Soviet football player and a Ukrainian coach and football commentator.

International career
Morozov played his only game for USSR on 29 June 1972, in a friendly against Uruguay.

Later life and death
Since 2008, he worked as football commentator at the Ukrainian sports channel Football 1. 

Morozov died from complications of COVID-19 on 22 October 2021, amid the COVID-19 pandemic in Ukraine . He was 71.

Honours
Zaria Voroshilovgrad
 Soviet Top League: 1972

References

External links
 Profile 
 

1950 births
2021 deaths
Deaths from the COVID-19 pandemic in Ukraine
Footballers from Kyiv
Soviet footballers
Ukrainian footballers
Association football midfielders
Soviet Union international footballers
Soviet Top League players
FC Nyva Vinnytsia players
FC Desna Chernihiv players
FC Shakhtar Stakhanov players
FC Zorya Luhansk players
PFC CSKA Moscow players
Ukrainian football managers
Ukrainian Premier League managers
Russian Premier League managers
FC Tyumen managers
Guangzhou City F.C. managers
FC Nyva Vinnytsia managers
FC Nisa Aşgabat managers
FC CSKA Kyiv managers
FC Borysfen Boryspil managers
FC Spartak Ivano-Frankivsk managers
FC Vorskla Poltava managers
FC Dnipro Cherkasy managers
Merited Coaches of Ukraine
Soviet expatriate footballers
Expatriate footballers in East Germany
Ukrainian expatriate sportspeople in China
Expatriate football managers in China
Ukrainian expatriate sportspeople in Russia
Expatriate football managers in Russia
Ukrainian expatriate sportspeople in Turkmenistan
Ukrainian association football commentators